The 4th Filipino Academy of Movie Arts and Sciences Awards Night was held on MARCH 17, 1956 for the Outstanding Achievements in 1955 at Fiesta Pavilion in Manila Hotel.

Higit Sa Lahat, by (LVN Pictures) is the recipient of this edition's FAMAS Award for Best Picture.

Awards

Major Awards
Winners are listed first and highlighted with boldface.

References

External links
FAMAS Awards 

FAMAS Award
FAMAS
FAMAS